Karang Anyar is an administrative village in the Sawah Besar district of Jakarta in Indonesia. It has postal code of 10740.

See also
List of administrative villages of Jakarta

Administrative villages in Jakarta